Vibrio harveyi is a Gram-negative, bioluminescent, marine bacterium in the genus Vibrio. V. harveyi is rod-shaped, motile (via polar flagella), facultatively anaerobic, halophilic, and competent for both fermentative and respiratory metabolism. It does not grow below 4 °C ( optimum growth: 30° to  35 °C). V. harveyi can be found free-swimming in tropical marine waters, commensally in the gut microflora of marine animals, and as both a primary and opportunistic pathogen of marine animals, including Gorgonian corals, oysters, prawns, lobsters, the common snook, barramundi, turbot, milkfish, and seahorses. It is responsible for luminous vibriosis, a disease that affects commercially farmed penaeid prawns. Additionally, based on samples taken by ocean-going ships, V. harveyi is thought to be the cause of the milky seas effect, in which, during the night, a uniform blue glow is emitted from the seawater.

Quorum sensing 
Groups of V. harveyi bacteria communicate by quorum sensing to coordinate the production of bioluminescence and virulence factors.  Quorum sensing was first studied in V. fischeri (now Aliivibrio fischeri), a marine bacterium that uses a synthase (LuxI) to produce a species-specific autoinducer (AI) that binds a cognate receptor (LuxR) that regulates changes in expression.  Coined "LuxI/R" quorum sensing, these systems have been identified in many other species of Gram-negative bacteria.  Despite its relatedness to A. fischeri, V. harveyi lacks a LuxI/R quorum-sensing system, and instead employs a hybrid quorum-sensing circuit, detecting its AI through a membrane-bound histidine kinase and using a phosphorelay to convert information about the population size to changes in gene expression.  Since their identification in V. harveyi, such hybrid systems have been identified in many other bacterial species.  V. harveyi uses a second AI, termed autoinducer-2 or AI-2, which is unusual because it is made and detected by a variety of different bacteria, both Gram-negative and Gram-positive.  Thus, V. harveyi has been instrumental to the understanding and appreciation of interspecies bacterial communication.

References

External links 
 V. harveyi at NCBI
 Vibrios at NCBI
Type strain of Vibrio harveyi at BacDive -  the Bacterial Diversity Metadatabase

Vibrionales
Bioluminescent bacteria
Bacteria described in 1936